Harold George Wolff (New York, 26 May 1898 - Washington D.C., 21 February 1962) was an American doctor, neurologist and scientist.
He is generally considered the father of modern headache research, and a pioneer in the study of psychosomatic illness.

Biography 
Harold Wolff was born on May 26, 1898, in New York City, the only child of Louis Wolff, a catholic illustrator, and Emma Recknagel Wolff, Lutheran. He was educated at City College, from which he graduated in 1918, aged 20.
After graduating, he worked in a government-supported fishery trying to improve drying fish. 
He considered becoming a priest before deciding to take up medicine at Harvard Medical School, where he received his M.D. in 1923.

After medical training at New York’s Roosevelt Hospital and Bellevue Hospital Center, he started to study neuropathology with Harry Forbes and Stanley Cobb.

In 1928 he travelled abroad, spending a year in Graz, in Austria, with Otto Loewi, and then with Ivan Pavlov in Leningrad, in Russia.

Returning to America, he moved to the Psychiatry ward at Phipps Clinic of Johns Hopkins University, working with Adolf Meyer (psychiatrist).

In 1932 he finally decided to come back in Boston and became the head of Neurology ward, supervised by Eugene Dubois. He later became also Professor of Medicine and Chief Neurologist at New York Hospital – Cornell Medical Center (NYH-CMC).

In 1934 Dr. Wolff married the well-known painter Isabel Bishop, and had a son, Remsen N. Wolff.
In 1958 he was named the first occupant of the “Anne Parrish Titzel Chair” in Medicine at Cornell University.

During his last years he devoted much of his energy to the work of the “Academy of Religion and Mental Health” and, after a lifelong agnosticism, became a member of “Christ Church (Episcopal)” in Riverdale, New York.

Harold Wolff died on February 21, 1962, in Washington D.C., of a cerebral vascular disease.

Personality 
He was defined a “combination of administrator and investigator”.

Wolff’s pupils described him as a superb clinician, a wise man who exercised vigorously and competitively, sometimes highly obsessive. He used to teach by example, in fact his motto was: "No day without its experiment".

Field of research 
Harold Wolff’s first major contribution was the elucidation of the mechanism of migraine and other headaches of vascular origin. He was the first neurologist that supported the hypothesis that the aura arises from a vasoconstriction and the headache from a vasodilatation. 
In fact, vasodilators (amylnitrite, carbon dioxide) abolished the aura temporarily or persistently, and vasoconstrictors (norepinephrine, ergotamine tartrate, caffeine) induced the aura.

Dr. Wolff was also interested in understanding the mind – body relationship, and established a separate category of illness to be defined as psychosomatic. There is a connection between nervous system and bodily diseases like peptic ulcer, ulcerative colitis, hypertension, etc.

However, Wolff's work on migraines also reveals sexism.  In his discussion of patients, he tended to focus on his male patients, who he described as being ambitious, efficient, perfectionistic, and successful. He thought were working too hard; they should relax more and get more exercise. In contrast, women patients were described as inadequate, unsatisfied, and frigid. In women, unlike men, migraines were pathologized.

Dr. Wolff also headed the Society for the Investigation of Human Ecology, which received funding from the CIA to investigate the manipulation of human behavior.
Dr. Wolff was a key participant in the CIA's MKULTRA program, conducting research to discover effective interrogation techniques. He collaborated with the CIA to collect information on a wide variety of torture methods, and stated the intention that his research program would:

Works 
 Human Gastric Function, Harold G. Wolff, Stewart Wolf; New York, Oxford University Press, 1943.
 Headache and Other Head Pain, Harold G. Wolff; New York, oxford University Press, 1948 (First Publication)
 Pain Sensations and Reactions, James D. Hardy, Harold Wolff, Helen Goodwell; New York, Hafner, 1952.
 Stress and Disease, Harold G. Wolff; Springfield, IL, US, Charles C. Thomas Publisher, 1953.

Bibliography 
 Stewart Wolf M.D., "In memoriam of Harold G. Wolff, M.D."; VOL.XXIV, NO.3, 1962.
 Louis Hausman, "Tribute to Harold G. Wolff, M.D."; Bull. N.Y. Acad. Med., VOL.38, NO.12, December 1962.
 Harold G. Wolff, "Headache and Other Head Pain"; Donald J. Dalessio, Stephen D. Silberstein, Richard B. Lipton, Oxford University Press, New York, 2001 (Seventh Publication).
 J.N. Blau, "Harold G. Wolff: the man and his migraine"; Blackwell Publishing Ltd Cephalalgia, 2004.
 Medical Center Archivies of New York-Presbyterian/Weill Cornell, "The Harold Wolff M.D. Papers", 1922-1970.

Notes 

Cornell University faculty
1898 births
1962 deaths
American neurologists
Harvard Medical School alumni
City College of New York alumni